Wish You Were Here is the ninth studio album by the English rock band Pink Floyd, released on 12 September 1975 through Harvest Records and Columbia Records. Based on material Pink Floyd composed while performing in Europe, Wish You Were Here was recorded over numerous sessions throughout 1975 at EMI Studios (now Abbey Road Studios) in London.

The themes include alienation and criticism of the music business. The bulk of the album is taken up by "Shine On You Crazy Diamond", a nine-part tribute to founding member Syd Barrett, who left the band seven years earlier due to his deteriorating mental health. Barrett coincidentally visited during the album's production in 1975. Like their previous record, The Dark Side of the Moon (1973), Pink Floyd used studio effects and synthesisers. Guest singers included Roy Harper, who provided the lead vocals on "Have a Cigar", and Venetta Fields, who added backing vocals to "Shine On You Crazy Diamond". To promote the album, the band released the double A-side single "Have a Cigar" / "Welcome to the Machine".

On its release, Wish You Were Here received mixed reviews from critics, who found its music uninspiring and inferior to the band's previous work. It has retrospectively received critical acclaim, hailed as one of the greatest albums of all time, and was cited by keyboardist Richard Wright and guitarist David Gilmour as their favourite Pink Floyd album.

Background
During 1974, Pink Floyd sketched out three new compositions, "Raving and Drooling" (which would become "Sheep"), "You Gotta Be Crazy" (which would become "Dogs") and "Shine On You Crazy Diamond". These songs were performed during a series of concerts in France and England, the band's first tour since 1973's The Dark Side of the Moon. As Pink Floyd had never employed a publicist and kept themselves distant from the press, their relationship with the media began to sour. Mason said later that a critical NME review by Syd Barrett devotee Nick Kent may have had an influence in keeping the band together, as they returned to the studio in the first week of 1975.

Concept
Wish You Were Here is Floyd's second album with a conceptual theme, mostly at Roger Waters' direction. It reflects his feeling that the camaraderie that had served the band was, by then, largely absent. The album begins with a long instrumental preamble and segues into the lyrics for "Shine On You Crazy Diamond", a tribute to Syd Barrett, whose mental breakdown had forced him to leave the group seven years earlier. Barrett is fondly recalled with lines such as "Remember when you were young, you shone like the sun" and "You reached for the secret too soon, you cried for the moon".

Wish You Were Here is also a critique of the music business. "Shine On" crosses seamlessly into "Welcome to the Machine", a song that begins with an opening door (described by Waters as a symbol of musical discovery and progress betrayed by a music industry more interested in greed and success) and ends with a party, the latter epitomising "the lack of contact and real feelings between people". Similarly, "Have a Cigar" scorns record industry "fat-cats" with the lyrics repeating a stream of cliches heard by rising newcomers in the industry, and including the question "by the way, which one's Pink?" asked of the band on at least one occasion. The lyrics of the next song, "Wish You Were Here", relate both to Barrett's condition and to the dichotomy of Waters' character, with greed and ambition battling with compassion and idealism.

"I had some criticisms of Dark Side of the Moon…" noted David Gilmour. "One or two of the vehicles carrying the ideas were not as strong as the ideas that they carried. I thought we should try and work harder on marrying the idea and the vehicle that carried it, so that they both had an equal magic… It's something I was personally pushing when we made Wish You Were Here."

Recording

Alan Parsons, EMI staff engineer for Pink Floyd's previous studio album, The Dark Side of the Moon, declined to continue working with them due to him starting his own group and working on their first album. The group had worked with engineer Brian Humphries on More, recorded at Pye Studios, and again in 1974 when he replaced an inexperienced concert engineer. Humphries was therefore the natural choice to work on the band's new material, although, being a stranger to EMI's Abbey Road set-up, he encountered some early difficulties. On one occasion, Humphries inadvertently spoiled the backing tracks for "Shine On", a piece that Waters and drummer Nick Mason had spent many hours perfecting, with echo. The entire piece had to be re-recorded.

The sessions for Wish You Were Here at EMI's Studio Three (now Abbey Road Studios) lasted from January until July 1975, recording on four days each week from 2:30 pm until very late in the evening. The group found it difficult at first to devise any new material, especially as the success of The Dark Side of the Moon had left all four physically and emotionally drained. Keyboardist Richard Wright later described these sessions as "falling within a difficult period", and Waters recalled them as "torturous". Mason found the process of multi-track recording drawn-out and tedious, while Gilmour was more interested in improving the band's existing material. Gilmour was also becoming increasingly frustrated with Mason, whose failing marriage had brought on a general malaise and sense of apathy, both of which interfered with his drumming.

Humphries gave his point of view regarding these struggled sessions in a 2014 interview: “There were days when we didn't do anything. I don't think they knew what they wanted to do. We had a dartboard and an air rifle and we'd play these word games, sit around, get drunk, go home and return the next day. That’s all we were doing until suddenly everything started falling into place.”

After several weeks, Waters began to visualise another concept. The three new compositions from 1974's tour were at least a starting point for a new album, and "Shine On You Crazy Diamond" seemed a reasonable choice as a centrepiece for the new work. Mostly an instrumental 20-minute-plus piece similar to "Echoes", the opening four-note guitar phrase reminded Waters of the lingering ghost of former band-member Syd Barrett.  Gilmour had composed the phrase entirely by accident, but was encouraged by Waters' positive response. Waters wanted to split "Shine On You Crazy Diamond", and sandwich two new songs between its two halves. Gilmour disagreed, but was outvoted three to one. "Welcome to the Machine" and "Have a Cigar" were barely veiled attacks on the music business, their lyrics working neatly with "Shine On" to provide an apt summary of the rise and fall of Barrett; "Because I wanted to get as close as possible to what I felt ... that sort of indefinable, inevitable melancholy about the disappearance of Syd." "Raving and Drooling" and "You’ve Got To Be Crazy" had no place in the new concept, and were set aside until the following album, 1977's Animals.

Syd Barrett's visit

On 5 June 1975, on the eve of Pink Floyd's second US tour that year, Gilmour married his first wife, Ginger. That day, the band were completing the mix of "Shine On You Crazy Diamond" when an overweight man with shaven head and eyebrows entered, carrying a plastic bag. Waters did not recognise him. Gilmour presumed he was an EMI staff member. Wright presumed he was a friend of Waters, but realised it was Barrett. Mason also failed to recognise him and was "horrified" when Gilmour identified him. In Mason's Pink Floyd memoir Inside Out, he recalled Barrett's conversation as "desultory and not entirely sensible". Cover artist Storm Thorgerson reflected on Barrett's presence: "Two or three people cried. He sat round and talked for a bit but he wasn't really there."

Waters was reportedly reduced to tears by the sight of his former bandmate. When fellow visitor Andrew King asked how Barrett had gained so much weight, Barrett said he had a large refrigerator in his kitchen and had been eating lots of pork chops. He mentioned that he was ready to help with the recording, but while listening to the mix of "Shine On", showed no signs of understanding its relevance to him. Barrett joined Gilmour's wedding reception in the EMI canteen, but left without saying goodbye. Apart from Waters seeing Barrett buying sweets in Harrods a couple of years later, it was the last time any member of the band saw him alive. Barrett's appearance may have influenced the final version of "Shine On You Crazy Diamond"; a subtle refrain performed by Wright from "See Emily Play" is audible towards the end. Waters said later: "'Shine On' is not really about Sydhe's just a symbol for all the extremes of absence some people have to indulge in because it's the only way they can cope with how fucking sad it is, modern life, to withdraw completely. I found that terribly sad."

Instrumentation

As with The Dark Side of the Moon, the band used synthesizers such as the EMS VCS 3 (on "Welcome to the Machine"), but softened with Gilmour's acoustic guitar, and percussion from Mason. The beginning of "Shine On" contains remnants from a previous but incomplete studio recording by the band known as "Household Objects". Wine glasses had been filled with varying amounts of fluid, and recordings were made of a wet finger circling the edge of each glass. These recordings were multi-tracked into chords.

Jazz violinist Stéphane Grappelli and classical violinist Yehudi Menuhin were performing in another studio in the building, and were invited to record a piece for the new album. Menuhin watched as Grappelli played on the song "Wish You Were Here"; however, the band later decided his contribution was unsuitable and, until 2011, it was believed that the piece had been wiped. It turns out his playing was included on the album, but so low in the final mix that the band presumed it would be insulting to credit him. He was paid £300 for his contribution (equivalent to £ in ). Saxophonist Dick Parry, who had performed on The Dark Side of the Moon, performed on "Shine On You Crazy Diamond". The opening bars of "Wish You Were Here" were recorded from Gilmour's car radio, with somebody turning the dial (the classical music heard is the finale of Tchaikovsky's Fourth Symphony).

Vocals
Recording sessions had twice been interrupted by US tours (one in April and the other in June 1975), and the final sessions, which occurred after the band's performance at Knebworth, proved particularly troublesome for Waters. He struggled to record the vocals for "Have a Cigar", requiring several takes to perform an acceptable version. His problems stemmed in part from the stresses placed upon his voice while recording the lead vocals of "Shine On You Crazy Diamond". Gilmour was asked to sing in his place, but declined, and eventually colleague and friend Roy Harper was asked to stand in. Harper was recording his own album in another of EMI's studios, and Gilmour had already performed some guitar licks for him. Waters later regretted the decision, believing he should have performed the song. The Blackberries recorded backing vocals for "Shine On You Crazy Diamond".

Touring 
The band played much of Wish You Were Here on 5 July 1975 at the Knebworth music festival. Roy Harper, performing at the same event, on discovering that his stage costume was missing, proceeded to destroy one of Pink Floyd's vans, injuring himself in the process. This delayed the normal setup procedure of the band's sound system. As a pair of World War II Spitfire aircraft had been booked to fly over the crowd during their entrance, the band were not able to delay their set. The result was that a power supply problem pushed Wright's keyboards completely out of tune, damaging the band's performance. At one point he left the stage, but the band were able to continue with a less sensitive keyboard, a piano and a simpler light show. Following a brief intermission, they returned to perform The Dark Side of the Moon, but critics displeased about being denied access backstage savaged the performance.

Packaging

Wish You Were Here was sold in one of the more elaborate packages to accompany a Pink Floyd album. Storm Thorgerson had accompanied the band on their 1974 tour and had given serious thought to the meaning of the lyrics, eventually deciding that the songs were, in general, concerned with "unfulfilled presence", rather than Barrett's illness. This theme of absence was reflected in the ideas produced by his long hours spent brainstorming with the band. Thorgerson had noted that Roxy Music's Country Life was sold in an opaque green cellophane sleeve – censoring the cover image – and he copied the idea, concealing the artwork for Wish You Were Here in a black-coloured shrink-wrap (therefore making the album art "absent"). The concept behind "Welcome to the Machine" and "Have a Cigar" suggested the use of a handshake (an often empty gesture), and George Hardie designed a sticker containing the album's logo of two mechanical hands engaged in a handshake, to be placed on the opaque sleeve (the mechanical handshake logo would also appear on the labels of the vinyl album this time in a black and blue background).

The album's cover images were photographed by Aubrey "Po" Powell, Thorgerson's partner at the design studio Hipgnosis, and inspired by the idea that people tend to conceal their true feelings, for fear of "getting burned", and thus two businessmen were pictured shaking hands, one man on fire. "Getting burned" was also a common phrase in the music industry, used often by artists denied royalty payments. Two stuntmen were used (Ronnie Rondell and Danny Rogers), one dressed in a fireproof suit covered by a business suit. His head was protected by a hood, underneath a wig. The photograph was taken at Warner Bros. Studios in California, known at the time as The Burbank Studios. Initially the wind was blowing in the wrong direction, and the flames were forced into Rondell's face, burning his moustache. The two stuntmen changed positions, and the image was later reversed. The versions released on Harvest label (in Europe) and on Columbia label (among others, USA, Canada and Australia) use similar, but different photos from the photo session.  

The album's back cover depicts a faceless "Floyd salesman", in Thorgerson's words, "selling his soul" in the desert (shot in the Yuma Desert in California again by Powell). The absence of wrists and ankles signifies his presence as an "empty suit". The inner sleeve shows a veil concealing a nude woman in a windswept Norfolk grove, and a splash-less diver at Mono Lake – titled Monosee (the German translation of Mono Lake) on the liner notes – in California (again emphasising the theme of absence). The decision to shroud the cover in black plastic was not popular with the band's US record company, Columbia Records, which insisted that it be changed but was over-ruled. EMI was less concerned; the band were reportedly extremely happy with the end product, and when presented with a pre-production mockup, they accepted it with a spontaneous round of applause.

Release

The album was released on 12 September 1975 in the UK, and on the following day in the US. It was Pink Floyd's first album with Columbia Records, an affiliate of CBS; the band and their manager Steve O'Rourke had been dissatisfied with the efforts of EMI's US label Capitol Records. The band remained with EMI's Harvest Records in Europe.

In Britain, with 250,000 advance sales, the album debuted at number three and reached number one the following week.  Demand was such that EMI informed retailers that only half of their orders would be fulfilled. With 900,000 advance orders (the largest for any Columbia release) it reached number one on the US Billboard chart in its second week. Wish You Were Here was Pink Floyd's fastest-selling album ever. The album was certified Silver and Gold (60,000 and 100,000 sales respectively) in the UK on 1 August 1975, and Gold in the US on 17 September 1975.  It was certified six times platinum on 16 May 1997, and by 2004 had sold an estimated 13 million copies worldwide.  "Have a Cigar" was chosen by Columbia as the first single, with "Welcome to the Machine" on the B-side in the US. The album was a commercial hit in Europe, topping Dutch, English and Spanish charts – in Spain, the album remained at number one for 20 weeks.

Reception 

On release, the album received mixed reviews. Ben Edmunds wrote in Rolling Stone that the band's "lackadaisical demeanor" leaves the subject of Barrett "unrealised; they give such a matter-of-fact reading of the goddamn thing that they might as well be singing about Roger Waters's brother-in-law getting a parking ticket." Edmunds concluded the band is "devoid" of the "sincere passion for their 'art that contemporary space rock acts purportedly have. Melody Maker reviewer wrote: "From whichever direction one approaches Wish You Were Here, it still sounds unconvincing in its ponderous sincerity and displays a critical lack of imagination in all departments." A positive review came from Robert Christgau in The Village Voice: "The music is not only simple and attractive, with the synthesizer used mostly for texture and the guitar breaks for comment, but it actually achieves some of the symphonic dignity (and cross-referencing) that The Dark Side of the Moon simulated so ponderously." Years later, he reflected further on the record: "My favorite Pink Floyd album has always been Wish You Were Here, and you know why? It has soul, that's why – it's Roger Waters's lament for Syd, not my idea of a tragic hero but as long as he's Roger's that doesn't matter."

Wish You Were Here has since been frequently regarded as one of the greatest albums of all time, and is generally ranked as one of the greatest progressive rock albums. In 2003, it was ranked at number 209 on Rolling Stone's list of the 500 greatest albums of all time, ranked at number 211 in a 2012 revised list, and ranked at number 264 in a 2020 revised list. In 2015, it was chosen as the fourth-greatest progressive rock album by Rolling Stone. In 2014, British rock magazine Louder ranked it as the seventh-greatest progressive rock album of all time. In 1998, Q readers voted Wish You Were Here the 34th-greatest album of all time. In 2000, the same magazine placed it at number 43 in its list of the 100 Greatest British Albums Ever. In 2000 it was voted number 38 in Colin Larkin's All Time Top 1000 Albums. In 2007, one of Germany's largest public radio stations, WDR 2, asked its listeners to vote for the 200 best albums of all time. Wish You Were Here was voted number one. In 2004, Wish You Were Here was ranked number 36 on Pitchfork Media's list of the Top 100 albums of the 1970s. IGN rated Wish You Were Here as the eighth-greatest classic rock album, and Ultimate Classic Rock placed Wish You Were Here second best in its list of "Worst to Best Pink Floyd Albums".

Despite the problems during production, the album remained Wright's favourite: "It's an album I can listen to for pleasure, and there aren't many Floyd albums that I can." Gilmour shares this view: "I for one would have to say that it is my favourite album, the Wish You Were Here album. The end result of all that, whatever it was, definitely has left me an album I can live with very very happily. I like it very much."

"Dark Side of the Moon and The Wall were the most complete albums we ever made," remarked Waters. "Wish You Were Here came close, without being a complete classic… For me, that album and Animals signalled the end of the band as it had been before."

Reissues and remastering
Wish You Were Here has been remastered and re-released on several formats. In the UK and US the album was re-issued in quadraphonic using the SQ format in 1976, and in 1980 a special Hi-Fi Today audiophile print was released in the UK. It was released on CD in Japan in October 1982, in the US in 1983, and in the UK in 1985, and again as a remastered CD with new artwork in 1994. In the US, Columbia's CBS Mastersound label released a half-speed mastered audiophile LP in 1981, and in 1994 Sony Mastersound released a 24-carat gold-plated CD, remastered using Super Bit Mapping, with the original artwork from the LP in both longbox and jewel case forms, the latter with a cardboard slipcover. The album was included as part of the box set Shine On, and three years later Columbia Records released an updated remastered CD, 17 seconds longer than the EMI remasters from 1994, giving a running time of 44:28.

The label was a recreation of the original machine handshake logo, with a black and blue background. The album was subsequently re-released in 2000 for its 25th anniversary, on the Capitol Records label in the US. The album was re-released and remixed in 2011. The Wish You Were Here – Immersion Box Set includes the new stereo digital remaster (2011) by James Guthrie on CD, an unreleased 5.1 Surround Mix (2009) by James Guthrie on DVD and Blu-ray, a Quad Mix (which had been released only on vinyl LP and 8-track tape) on DVD, as well as the original stereo mix (1975) on DVD and Blu-ray. This campaign also featured the 2011 stereo remaster on 180g heavyweight vinyl, as well as the 2011 stereo remaster and the 5.1 surround sound mix (2009) as a hybrid Super Audio CD (SACD). In 2016, the 180g vinyl was re-released on the band's own Pink Floyd Records label (with distribution by Warner Music and Sony Music) this time remastered by James Guthrie, Joel Plante and Bernie Grundman.

Track listing

Personnel

Pink Floyd
 David Gilmour – vocals, guitars, pedal steel guitar, EMS Synthi AKS, additional bass, glass harmonica, tape effects
 Roger Waters – vocals, bass guitar, EMS VCS 3, additional guitar, glass harmonica, tape effects
 Richard Wright – Hammond organ, ARP String Ensemble, Minimoog, Steinway piano, EMS VCS 3, Hohner Clavinet D6, Wurlitzer EP-200 electric piano, Rhodes piano, glass harmonica, backing vocals
 Nick Mason – drums, percussion, timpani, cymbals, tape effects

Additional musicians
 Dick Parry – tenor and baritone saxophone on “Shine On You Crazy Diamond”
 Roy Harper – lead vocals on “Have a Cigar”
 Venetta Fields – backing vocals
 Carlena Williams – backing vocals

Production
 Brian Humphries – engineering
 Peter James – engineering, assistant engineering
 Bernie Caulder
 Phil Taylor – additional photography (remaster)
 Hipgnosis – design, photography
 Peter Christopherson, Jeff Smith, Howard Bartrop and Richard Manning – design assistants
 George Hardie – graphics
 Jill Furmanovsky – additional photography (remaster)
 Doug Sax, James Guthrie – 1992 remastering at  The Mastering Lab
 James Guthrie, Joel Plante – 2011 remastering at das boot recording

Charts

Weekly charts

Year-end charts

Certifications and sales

References
Informational notes

Citations

Bibliography

Further reading
 
 For a television documentary on the album, see

External links

 Official Pink Floyd website
 

Certification Table Entry usages for Argentina
Certification Table Entry usages for Australia
Certification Table Entry usages for Austria
Certification Table Entry usages for Canada
Certification Table Entry usages for France
Certification Table Entry usages for Germany
Certification Table Entry usages for Italy
Certification Table Entry usages for Poland
Certification Table Entry usages for United Kingdom
Certification Table Entry usages for United States
1975 albums
Albums produced by David Gilmour
Albums produced by Nick Mason
Albums produced by Richard Wright (musician)
Albums produced by Roger Waters
Albums with cover art by Hipgnosis
Albums with cover art by Storm Thorgerson
Capitol Records albums
Columbia Records albums
Concept albums
EMI Records albums
Harvest Records albums
Pink Floyd albums